The national flag of Malaysia, also known as the Stripes of Glory, is composed of a field of 14 alternating red and white stripes along the fly and a blue canton bearing a crescent and a 14-point star known as the Bintang Persekutuan (Federal Star). The 14 stripes, of equal width, represent the equal status in the federation of the 13 member states and the federal territories, while the 14 points of the star represent the unity among these entities. The crescent represents Islam, the country's state religion; the blue canton symbolises the unity of the Malaysian people; the yellow of the star and crescent is the royal colour of the Malay rulers. It is in the stars and stripes and the Muslim crescent flag families.

Construction sheet

History

Selection
The current Malaysian flag is based on the flag of the Federation of Malaya. In 1949, a year after the Federation was created, the Federal Legislative Council called for a contest to design a new national flag. The competition attracted 373 entries, three of which were put forward to the public in a poll held by The Malay Mail.

The first flag had a ring of 11 white stars on a blue background, with two red Malay kris (daggers) in the middle. The second was the same as the first but with two concentric rings of 5 and 6 stars. The third had 11 blue and white stripes, and a red field in the top-left corner with a white crescent and five-pointed star on it. This last design was chosen as the winner.

In December 1949, the Federal Legislative Council decided to make changes to the winning design. At the suggestion of statesman Onn Jaafar, the red and blue colours were swapped, the crescent and star were changed from white to yellow, and six more points were added to the star. The final version of the Malayan flag was approved by George VI on 19 May 1950 and was first raised in front of the Sultan of Selangor's residence on 26 May 1950. On 31 August 1957, it was raised upon independence at Merdeka Square in place of the British Union Flag.

Symbolism
As the flag was finalised for official use, the significance of the design were given as follows:
 Red, white and blue – represents Malaysia as a country belonging in the Commonwealth.
 Crescent and star – represents Islam as the official religion for the Federation, as yellow symbolises sovereignty of the Malay Rulers and their roles as leader of the faith in the constituent states. The eleven-pointed star itself symbolises the  "unity and co-operation" of said member states.

The designer

 

The Malayan flag was designed by Mohamed Hamzah, a 29-year-old architect working for the Public Works Department (JKR) in Johor Baharu, Johor. He entered the national flag design competition with two designs that he had completed in two weeks. The first was a green flag with blue kris in the middle, surrounded by 15 white stars. The second, which became one of the three finalists, was said to be inspired by the flag of Johor, but with five white stripes added to the blue field.

Mohamed Hamzah died just short of his 75th birthday on 13 February 1993 in Jalan Stulang Baru, Kampung Melayu Majidee, Johor.

Modifications

Following the formation of Malaysia on 16 September 1963, the design of the Malayan flag was modified to reflect and honour the new states in the federation.

Three additional stripes were added to the existing flag and the star was given 14 points to reflect the federation of the original 11 states in Malaya plus Sabah, Sarawak, and Singapore; the design remained the same even after Singapore's expulsion from the federation two years later. When Kuala Lumpur was designated a Federal Territory on 1 February 1974, the additional stripe and the point in the star were appropriated to represent this new addition to the federation. Eventually, with the addition of two other federal territories, Labuan in 1984 and Putrajaya in 2001, the fourteenth stripe and point in the star came to be associated with the federal government in general.

In 1997, when Malaysians were invited to name the flag, then Prime Minister Mahathir Mohamad picked the name Jalur Gemilang to project the country's onward drive toward continuous growth and success.

Mark of respect
During the National Day celebrations, everyone is encouraged to fly the Jalur Gemilang at their homes, office buildings, shops and corporate premises.
 If the flag is fixed at home, it is to be raised pointing toward the road.
 If the flag is put in a group of flags with state and private company flags, the Malaysian flag must be raised in between two flags and its pole placed higher than the rest.

Historical flags

Flag anthem
The flag anthem is written as dedication and pride of the Malaysian national flag. It is performed on Hari Merdeka, the nation's independence day on 31 August every year. The original anthem Benderaku was written by Malaysian songwriter Tony Fonseka. After the flag was given the name Jalur Gemilang, the flag anthem was updated in 1997 to reflect this change. This was then followed by an introduction of a new flag anthem, with arrangements by Malaysian songwriter Pak Ngah and lyrics by Malaysian songwriter Siso Kopratasa.

Other ensigns and flags
Government vessels use the Jalur Gemilang as the state ensign. The following is a table of the other ensigns used in Malaysia with the national flag inside.

Federal Star (Bintang Persekutuan)
The Federal Star is similar in concept of Australia's Commonwealth Star in that it symbolises the unity of states in the Malaysian federation and its Federal government, featuring 14 points to represent the federation's 13 states and the federal territories. It is also used on the Royal Malaysian Air Force roundel, the Malaysian Chinese Association (MCA)  and the former United Malayan Banking Corporation (UMBC) logo.

The Patani Malayu National Revolutionary Front, a Southern Thai Malay separatist group involved in the South Thailand insurgency, originally adopted an independence flag that incorporated a crescent and 15-point variation of the Federal Star on its flag to represent the southernmost Thai provinces' closer tie to Malay and Muslim-majority Malaysia over that of Thailand.

See also
 List of Malaysian flags
 List of Malaysian patriotic songs

Notes

References

Further reading

External links
 
 

Flags introduced in 1950
1950 establishments in Malaya
1963 establishments in Malaysia
 
Malaysia
National symbols of Malaysia
Jalur Gemilang
Malaysia